Felimida dalli is a species of sea slug, a dorid nudibranch, a shell-less marine gastropod mollusk in the family Chromodorididae.

Distribution
This species is found in the Tropical Eastern Pacific Ocean from Baja California to the Galapagos Islands.

Ecology
Felimida dalli feeds on sponge Hyrtios erecta. cf.

References

Further reading
 Keen M. (1971) Sea shells of tropical West America. Marine mollusks from Baja California to Perú, ed. 2. Stanford University Press. 1064 pp
 Bertsch H. (1977) The Chromodoridinae nudibranchs from the Pacific coast of America.- Part I. Investigative methods and supra-specific taxonomy. The Veliger 20(2): 107-118.
 Rudman W.B. (1984) The Chromodorididae (Opisthobranchia: Mollusca) of the Indo-West Pacific: a review of the genera. Zoological Journal of the Linnean Society 81 (2/3): 115-273. page(s): 156
 Johnson R.F. & Gosliner T.M. (2012) Traditional taxonomic groupings mask evolutionary history: A molecular phylogeny and new classification of the chromodorid nudibranchs. PLoS ONE 7(4): e33479.

External links
 Glossodoris dalli page at nudipixel

Chromodorididae
Gastropods described in 1879